EU43 may refer to:
 EU43 (electric locomotive), a class of electric multisystem locomotives similar to FS Class E412 ordered by Polish State Railways but today used in Italy
 EU43, a class of Bombardier TRAXX locomotives used by Polish State Railways